Agave atrovirens, called maguey verde grande is a type of century plant native to Oaxaca, Pueblo and Veracruz states in Mexico. It is the largest of all the Agaves, occasionally reaching a weight of two long tons (2 metric tonnes). As in other Agaves the leaves form a rosette, from the center of which, after many years, a panicle of flowers emerges on a long scape or peduncle which at first looks like a vast stalk of asparagus, but later grows to more than forty feet (more than 12 meters) in height, develops side branches near the top and numerous flowers which open red and gradually turn yellow. Agave salmiana, the species with the tallest inflorescences, is frequently lumped with A. atrovirens as the varieties A. a. salmiana or A. a. sigmatophylla. If this is valid, then A. atrovirens also has the tallest inflorescences of any Agave, and of any known plant. Each rosette flowers and fruits once, then dies. According to Fayaz this is one of the species which makes offsets or "pups". A. atrovirens is one of the pulque agaves used in the production of mezcal.

References

atrovirens